The  Nyansapo Festival was held in Paris between July 28-30 2017. The festival, which describes itself as "Afro-feminist", was organized by the Mwasi Collective. It was aimed at black women, for whom most of the festival space was be reserved, with segregated areas for black men and non-black people. The main space was at the La Générale cultural centre. 

Nyansapo was accused of racial discrimination, by organisations like SOS Racisme and International League against Racism and Anti-Semitism for attempting to ban white people from a majority (80%) of the space at the venue, with the Parisian mayor Anne Hidalgo demanding its cancellation.

See also 
Racism in France
Discrimination in Europe

References 

African diaspora in Paris
Black culture in Europe
Black feminism
Feminism in France
Festivals in Paris
Women-only spaces
Women's organizations based in France